The Station was a nightclub and music venue located in Fern Park, Florida. It played an important role in the Orlando music scene for over 20 years. The station hosted artists such as Green Day, Cry of Love, David Lee Roth, Dio, Mr. Big, Vince Neil, Paul Rodgers, Great White, Adam Ant, Ace Frehley, Ugly Kid Joe and Dream Theater. While playing drums for the Orlando-based rock band, Dorian Gray, Jani Lane, who would go on to international fame as the lead vocalist for the rock band, Warrant, performed his vocal debut at the venue. The Station closed around 2003.

References

Music venues in Florida
Nightclubs in Florida
Drinking establishments in Florida